The Achaemenid Empire was the first Persian empire, founded in 550 BC by Cyrus the Great. This article contains the Achaemenid family tree.

Family tree

See also
:Template:Cyrus-tree

Notes

*: Unconfirmed rulers, due to the Behistun Inscription.

References 

 
Dynasty genealogy